The Romance of Tarzan is a 1918 American silent action adventure film directed by Wilfred Lucas starring Elmo Lincoln, Enid Markey, Thomas Jefferson, and Cleo Madison.  The movie was the second Tarzan movie ever made, and is based on Edgar Rice Burroughs' original 1912 novel Tarzan of the Apes. It adapts only the second part of the novel, the earlier portion having been the basis for the preceding film Tarzan of the Apes (1918). Less popular than its predecessor due to much of the action taking place in the wild west rather than Africa, the film has not been preserved, and no prints of it are known to survive today.

Plot
The film opens with flashbacks from Tarzan of the Apes to establish the back story. The African expedition led by Professor Porter (Thomas Jefferson) to find Tarzan (Elmo Lincoln), the ape-raised heir of Lord Greystoke, has been crowned with success, and Tarzan and Porter's daughter Jane (Enid Markey) are in love.

The party now prepares to return to civilization when it is attacked by natives and separated from the ape-man. Tarzan's paternal cousin William Cecil Clayton (Colin Kenny), the current Lord Greystoke, desiring to keep his wealth and title, reports having seen the savages kill Tarzan. Believing him dead, they leave without their charge. But Tarzan has in fact survived, and is eager to be reunited with Jane. Finding his new friends gone he swims out to another boat to follow.

Eventually he reaches the United States, and is landed near the Porters' ranch in San Francisco, California. Tarzan in civilization is like a bull in a china shop, as is demonstrated early in a destructive incident in a dance hall, where his prowess impresses La Belle Odine (Cleo Madison). Things get back on track when Jane is kidnapped by outlaws, presenting him with the opportunity to rescue her. Jane, however, is cold to him, as Clayton has falsely convinced her he is in love with the other woman. Heartbroken, Tarzan swears off civilization and returns to Africa. Belatedly learning the truth from Odine, Jane follows, and is happily reunited with her lover in the jungle.

Cast
Elmo Lincoln as Tarzan
Enid Markey as Jane
Thomas Jefferson as Professor Porter
Cleo Madison as the Other Woman, La Belle Odine
Clyde Benson as Lawyer
Monte Blue as Juan
True Boardman as Lord Greystoke
John Cook (Undetermined Role)
Nigel De Brulier as Priest
Phil Dunham as Englishman
George B. French as Binns
Gordon Griffith as Tarzan as a Boy
Colin Kenny as Clayton
Kathleen Kirkham as Lady Greystoke
Bessie Toner (Undetermined Role)

Reception
Like many American films of the time, The Romance of Tarzan was subject to cuts by city and state film censorship boards. For example, the Chicago Board of Censors required a cut, in Reel 2, of Tarzan choking a native with his arm, Reel 4, Tarzan kissing a young woman on her breast, Reel 6, the intertitle "If you will only spare him I will go back and be your slave", a scene showing Tarzan lifting a man off his feet and choking him, and two scenes of Tarzan choking a man.

See also
List of lost films

References

External links

The Romance of Tarzan entry in ERBzine

1918 films
1910s action adventure films
1910s fantasy films
American action adventure films
American black-and-white films
American sequel films
American silent feature films
Films based on American novels
Films set in San Francisco
First National Pictures films
Lost American films
Tarzan films
American fantasy films
Censored films
1910s American films
Silent action adventure films